Prior to its uniform adoption of proportional representation in 1999, the United Kingdom used first-past-the-post for the European elections in England, Scotland and Wales. The European Parliament constituencies used under that system were smaller than the later regional constituencies and only had one Member of the European Parliament each.

The constituency of London South and Surrey East was one of them. It was merged from the London South and Surrey constituencies.

When it was created in England in 1984, it consisted of the Westminster Parliament constituencies of Carshalton and Wallington, Croydon Central, Croydon North East, Croydon North West, Croydon South, East Surrey, Reigate and Sutton and Cheam. In boundary changes which took effect at the 1994 European Election, it lost the Reigate constituency but gained Epsom and Ewell.

Members of the European Parliament

Election results

References

External links
 David Boothroyd's United Kingdom Election Results

London South and Surrey East
South and Surrey East
Politics of Surrey
20th century in London
1984 establishments in England
1999 disestablishments in England
Constituencies established in 1984
Constituencies disestablished in 1999